Roman Pavlík (born 17 January 1976) is a former Czech footballer. His position was goalkeeper.

External links

1976 births
Living people
Czech footballers
Association football goalkeepers
Czech First League players
Bohemians 1905 players
SK Kladno players
FC Viktoria Plzeň players
People from Klatovy
Sportspeople from the Plzeň Region